John Joseph Akar (1927–1975) was a Sierra Leonean entertainer, writer, and diplomat. He served as Sierra Leonean ambassador to the United States. Today, he is probably best known for composing the music of Sierra Leone's National Anthem.

Early life 
Akar was born in the small town of Rotifunk, Moyamba District in the Southern Province of British Sierra Leone, to an ethnic Sherbro mother and to a Lebanese father. Akar attended the E.U.B. primary school in Rotifunk, and proceeded to Albert Academy secondary school in Freetown. After he completed his secondary education, he moved to the United States.

Career 
In 1960, Akar became the first non-Creole and the first Sherbro to be appointed Director of Broadcasting of the Sierra Leone Broadcasting Services (SLBS).

In 1963, Akar founded the National Dance Troupe to encourage Sierra Leoneans to have pride in their cultural heritage. In 1964, he and the National Dance Troupe were invited to the United States to perform at New York World's Fair. They were presented with a plaque won for giving the best performance of the fair. In late 1964, they performed at the art festival in London. In 1965 they performed at the Negro Arts Festival in Dakar, Senegal. In 1966, they went on a four-month tour of Europe, including performances in Germany, Sweden and France.

Akar was a repeat guest on the Merv Griffin Show on television.

References

External links 
 https://web.archive.org/web/20070701223936/http://www.sierra-leone.org/heroes10.html

1927 births
1975 deaths
Sierra Leonean journalists
Sherbro people
National anthem writers
Sierra Leonean people of Lebanese descent
Ambassadors of Sierra Leone to the United States
Sierra Leonean composers
People from Moyamba District
20th-century journalists